The Treason Act 1381 (5 Ric.2 c.7) was an Act of the Parliament of England. It stipulated that "none from henceforth make nor begin any manner of riot and rumour, nor other like." To do so was made high treason. The Act was passed in response to the Peasants' Revolt earlier that year. It was repealed in 1399 by the Act of 1 Hen.4 c.10.

References
Statutes at Large, vol. I, Danby Pickering, Cambridge University Press, 1765.

See also
High treason in the United Kingdom
Treason Act 1397
Treason Act

Treason in England
Acts of the Parliament of England
1380s in law
1381 in England
Peasants' Revolt
Riots and civil disorder in England